Welcome to Nollywood is a 2007 documentary film directed by Jamie Meltzer, which premiered at the Full Frame Documentary Film Festival, and also played at the Avignon Film Festival and the Melbourne International Film Festival in the summer of 2007.

Premise
The Nigerian film industry, known as Nollywood, has exploded in the last ten years. Now the most popular cinema in all of West Africa—more popular even than imports of Hollywood or Bollywood films—the Nigerian film industry has distinguished itself by shooting all films (called video films there) on digital video. This has allowed production schedules to be compressed (films are shot in several days) and immediately brought to market (distribution consists of bringing films to Idumota electronics market in Lagos and selling them for home viewing). The sheer volume of Nigerian video films is staggering: one estimate has a film being produced for each day of the year. Nollywood is now the third-largest film industry in the world, generating US$286 million per year for the Nigerian economy. And yet this vibrant, profitable industry is virtually unknown outside of Africa.

The film looks into this newly emerging film industry, exploring its peculiar inner workings, economic challenges, and diverse array of colorful films. Traveling to the country’s chaotic largest city, Lagos, Meltzer spent ten weeks following three of Nigeria’s hottest directors, each different in personality and style, as they shot their films about love, betrayal, war and the supernatural. Welcome to Nollywood tells the stories of these three directors and their latest productions, whilst also using interviews with scholars, actors, and journalists who celebrate, in insightful and often humorous ways, the Nigerian video-film industry as a whole, its unique character and genres, as well as its impact on the culture of West Africa and Africans at home and abroad.

Cast list (documentary subjects)
 Izu Ojukwu - Director
 Chico Ejiro - Producer/Director
 Don Pedro Obaseki - Producer/Director
 Charles Novia -Producer/Director
 Shan George - Actress
 Peace Anyiam-Fiberesima - Producer
 Tunde Kelani - Producer/Director
 J.T. Tom West - Actor
 Richard Mofe Damijo - Actor
 Francis Duru - Actor

Reception
Review by Lisa Nesselson at Variety from the Avignon Film Festival: "Jamie Meltzer's Welcome to Nollywood boasts wall-to-wall bravado filtered through African-style entrepreneurship: Hook any of the producer-directors profiled here to a generator and the energy might just offset global reliance on oil. Docu is a must for cinema classrooms and fests and a hoot for curious auds on tube and beyond."

See also
 Cinema of Nigeria
 This Is Nollywood
 Nollywood Babylon

References

External links
 
 

2007 films
2007 documentary films
American documentary films
Documentary films about African cinema
Documentary films about Nigeria
2000s English-language films
Nigerian documentary films
2000s American films